Jackson Lake Lodge is located near Moran in Grand Teton National Park, in the U.S. state of Wyoming. The lodge has 385 rooms, a restaurant, conference rooms, and offers numerous recreational opportunities. The lodge is owned by the National Park Service, and operated under contract by the Grand Teton Lodge Company. The Grand Teton Lodge Company also manages the Jenny Lake Lodge, as well as cabins, restaurants and other services at Colter Bay Village. The lodge is located east of Jackson Lake adjacent to prime moose habitat below the Jackson Lake Dam.

History
In 1950, John D. Rockefeller Jr. called on architect Gilbert Stanley Underwood to design the Jackson Lake Lodge. This building marked the transition in the National Park System from rustic to modern design. Underwood revolutionized park architecture by combining modern materials with rustic accents, such as the wood grain-textured concrete seen on this building. Rockefeller developed the lodge to help make parks accessible to all Americans. Although the lodge was originally criticized for being too modern, it harmonizes with the natural surroundings with a low profile receding amid the aspen and pine trees. Landscapers planted native species mimicking the local environment.

Designed by architect Gilbert Stanley Underwood and completed in 1955, the lodge is an example of the National Park Service's interpretation of the International Style which was commonly seen in structures built on U.S. Government parklands in the mid-20th century. The lodge combines elements of the more rustic structures of the earlier decades of the 20th century with a more modern design elements that became standard for the next couple of decades.

The Federal Reserve holds an annual Jackson Hole Economic Symposium at the lodge in late summer, hosted by the Federal Reserve Bank of Kansas City and attended by prominent economic policymakers from around the world.

Old Jackson Lake Lodge
The resort complex was built over the site of the Amoretti Hotel and Camp Company's Jackson Lake Lodge, built by Eugene Amoretti of Lander, Wyoming from 1922. Amoretti's lodge, boasting the first hot and cold running water in the valley, featured guest cabins and tent cabins. It was purchased by the Snake River Land Company in 1930 and continued to operate until 1953, when its 23 cabins were demolished in favor of the new resort.

Historic district
Jackson Lake Lodge is the main property of a  National Historic Landmark District that has 38 contributing buildings and one contributing site. The district was added to the National Register of Historic Places on July 31, 2003 for its significance in architecture, entertainment/recreation, and conservation.

Gallery

See also
 National Register of Historic Places listings in Teton County, Wyoming
 List of National Historic Landmarks in Wyoming
 Historical buildings and structures of Grand Teton National Park

References

External links

Jackson Lake Lodge Hotel Site
Grand Teton National Park - Jackson Lake Lodge 
Jackson Lake Lodge National Historic Landmark at the Wyoming State Historic Preservation Office

Hotel buildings completed in 1955
Buildings and structures in Grand Teton National Park
National Historic Landmarks in Wyoming
Hotels in Wyoming
Mission 66
Gilbert Stanley Underwood buildings
Tourist attractions in Teton County, Wyoming
Hotel buildings on the National Register of Historic Places in Wyoming
National Register of Historic Places in Grand Teton National Park
1955 establishments in Wyoming
National Park Service rustic in Wyoming
Historic districts on the National Register of Historic Places in Wyoming